The 2005 NCAA Division I women's volleyball tournament began on December 1, 2005 with 64 teams and concluded on December 17, 2005, when Washington defeated Nebraska 3 games to 0 in San Antonio, Texas for the program's first NCAA title.

The 2005 NCAA Final Four, held at the Alamodome, had two participants who were making the school's first-ever Final Four appearance. Fifteenth-seeded Tennessee and unseeded Santa Clara upset their way into the semifinals. In the rally scoring era (since 2001), no unseeded team had ever reached the national semifinals, while Tennessee was the lowest overall seed to reach the Final Four.

The 2005 NCAA Tournament was the 25th anniversary of the NCAA Women's Volleyball Championship.

Records

Omaha Regional

Upsets
As expected, Nebraska, UCLA, Louisville, and Florida got to the Sweet 16 round. Florida swept past Louisville and top seeded Nebraska swept past UCLA to advance to the regional finals. Nebraska defeated Florida, 30-26, 30-24, 30-16 to advance to the final four.

Stanford Regional

Upsets
Many upsets were seen in this regional. In the second round, defending national champion and fifth seeded Stanford was stunned by unseeded Santa Clara on their home floor. Then, unseeded Pepperdine defeated twelfth seeded Southern California on Southern California's home court. The upsets continued in the second round, as unseeded Ohio defeated thirteenth seeded Ohio St. on the Buckeye's home floor. The only upset not seen was 4th seeded Arizona defeating Utah, and advanced to the Sweet 16 as the only remaining seeded participant.

Santa Clara defeated Pepperdine, 3-0, to advance to the regional finals. Arizona was nearly the victim of yet another upset, outlasting a 5-game match to Ohio. However, in the next round, Arizona was the victim of an upset, as Santa Clara defeated them, 3-2, to advance to their first final four in school history. Santa Clara won the fifth and deciding game, 17-15.

College Station Regional

Upsets
No upsets were seen up until the regional semifinals, when Wisconsin defeated 6th seeded Notre Dame in a 5-game match.

University Park Regional

Upsets
The University Park regional ended up much like the Stanford regional in terms of upsets. In the first regional semifinal, Missouri surprised Hawai'i by defeating them, 3-1. Then, Tennessee stunned second seeded Penn State on Penn State's home floor, 3-1. Missouri and Tennessee battled in University Park, with Tennessee outlasting Missouri in four games, and much like Santa Clara in the Stanford regional who upset high seeds, advanced to their first final four in school history.

Final Four – Alamodome, San Antonio, Texas

National Semifinal recap

Nebraska vs. Santa Clara 

Santa Clara's dream run came to an end, as top seeded Nebraska overpowered them, 30-24, 30-19, 30-21. Nebraska hit .449% as a team, while Santa Clara hit just .145%. Nebraska advanced to the title match, sweeping through each opponent in the process.

Washington vs. Tennessee 

Oddly similar to the first semifinal, Tennessee's dream run came to end in another sweep with nearly identical scores to the Nebraska/Santa Clara match, by defeating them 30-25, 30-19, 30-21. Much like Nebraska, Washington swept through each opponent to earn a spot in the title match. It is the first national title attempt in school history.

National Championship recap: Nebraska vs. Washington
In front of 9,000 fans in the Alamodome, top ranked and top seeded Nebraska battled second ranked and third seeded Washington for the national title. Nebraska was ranked number one in the coaches poll all season long, and was trying to become the second school in NCAA history to hold the top spot every week in the season, as Southern California did it in 2003. Washington is coached by Jim McLaughlin

Washington jumped out to a quick 2-0 lead in the first game, prompting AVCA National Coach of the Year John Cook to take an early timeout. Washington dominated throughout the match, winning the first two games, 30-26, 30-25. Despite Nebraska taking an early 7-2 lead in the third game, Washington closed the gap and at 18, it was tied up. The teams remained close until the end, when Washington went on a 4-1 scoring run, and off a solo block from MVP Christal Morrison, Washington stunned Nebraska in a sweep, to claim their first ever national championship.

With the sweep, Washington became just the second school in NCAA history to sweep through every opponent en route to winning the NCAA title, joining Texas from 1988. It was the first time since 2002 that Nebraska had been swept.

Washington coach McLaughlin became the first coach in NCAA history to win a national championship in both men and women's volleyball, as he guided Southern California men's team to the 1990 NCAA title. Before McLaughlin took over for the Washington program in 2001, their record was 8-19. Washington finished off the 2005 season 32-1, the only loss coming to UCLA in a five set match. Ironically, that loss was UCLA head coach Andy Banachowski’s 1,000th career win.

NCAA Tournament records

There are two NCAA tournament records that were set in the 2005 tournament that still stand.

Hitting percentage, match (individual record) - Nicole Fawcett, Penn State University, .889% vs. Long Island (16-0-18)
Digs, match (individual record) - Taylor Rayfield, University of North Carolina - 53 digs vs. College of Charleston

See also
NCAA Women's Volleyball Championship
AVCA

References

NCAA Women's Volleyball Championship
NCAA
Sports competitions in San Antonio
Volleyball in Texas
2005 in sports in Texas
December 2005 sports events in the United States
College sports tournaments in Texas
Women's sports in Texas